Halcro or St. Andrews is a district in Saskatchewan, Canada north of St. Louis and south of Prince Albert. Adjacent to the South Saskatchewan River, it was initially settled by Anglo-Metis from Manitoba in the 1870s. Halcro is located in the aspen parkland biome.

Education

Red Deer Hill has an elementary school called Osborne.  It is located on Osborne Road and is a part of the Saskatchewan Rivers School Division.

Osborne opened in the late 1960s.  It at one time had over 200 students.  It is now down to about 95.

Religion
Halcro has an Anglican church with a cemetery.  The church is called St. Andrew's and located on Halcro Church Road.  Early in 2006, the church was vandalized and the consensus was to demolish it.  But after a meeting was held in Birch Hills, they decided that the foundation was in good enough condition that it could be fixed.

Unincorporated communities in Saskatchewan
Prince Albert No. 461, Saskatchewan
Division No. 15, Saskatchewan